Ditullio is a surname. Notable people with the surname include:

Janine Ditullio, American comedy writer, voice actress, and comedian
Jason DiTullio (born 1984), Canadian soccer player and coach